Peter Burns (26 May 1939 – 12 February 2009) was an  Australian rules footballer who played with St Kilda in the Victorian Football League (VFL).

Notes

External links 

1939 births
2009 deaths
Australian rules footballers from Victoria (Australia)
St Kilda Football Club players